Masuma Anwar is a Pakistani pediatric doctor, singer-songwriter and musician. She rose to prominence with her cover singles of folk-songs such as "Ve Asaan Tenu Ki Akhna", "Ve main chori chori" and "Neyu La leya".

Early life and career
After completing her bachelors of medicine and surgery from Frontier Medical College, she released her first album Dhola in 2008 and received critical appraisal. She completed her medical degree in 2011 and released three more albums including Nigah-e-Karam, Apna Mukaam Paida Kar and Kamli. Kamli  added further recognition for her singing career and she received Best Emerging Talent – Music nomination at the 15th Lux Style Awards.

As a singer, she was inspired by Bade Ghulam Ali Khan, Abida Parveen, Ustad Muhammad Juman and the popular folk singer Reshma.
 
In 2012, she made her Bollywood debut in film Cocktail, and was praised for her song "Luttna". In 2016, she recorded her first song "Naina Roye", for Pakistani film Maalik, that became popular. In the same year, she made her Coke Studio debut as a featured artist in season 9, as a part of team Faakhir.

Discography

Film
 "Luttna" – Cocktail (2012)
 "Naina Roye" – Maalik (2016)

Coke Studio
 2016 Jhaliya with Javed Bashir in Episode 6 : Coke Studio Pakistan (Season 9)

Albums
 Dhola  
 Nigah-e-Karam  
 Apna Mukaam Paida Kar  
 Kamli

Singles
 "Kalaam-e-Faiz" (2015)
 "Safar ul Ishq" (2015)
 "Maza muft ka" (2014)

Awards and nominations

References

External links
  
 Masuma Anwar at Coke Studio 

Living people
Pakistani women singers
Pakistani ghazal singers
People from Islamabad
Performers of Sufi music
Punjabi singers
Kashmiri people
Kashmiri musicians
Punjabi-language singers
Pakistani musicians
Pakistani folk singers
Women ghazal singers
Coke Studio (Pakistani TV program)
Year of birth missing (living people)